Streit is a surname, and may refer to:

Albert Streit (born 1980), German football player
Clarence Streit (1896–1986), American journalist and Atlanticist
Esther Streit-Wurzel (1932−2013, Israeli children's books author and educator
Georgios Streit (1868–1948), Greek lawyer and professor
Jindřich Štreit (born 1946), Czech photographer and pedagogue
Kurt Streit (born 1959), Austrian-American tenor
Mario Streit (born 1967), German rower
Mark Streit (born 1977), Swiss ice hockey player
Marlene Streit (born 1934), Canadian golfer
Martin Streit (born 1977), Czech ice hockey player
Michael J. Streit (born 1950), American lawyer and judge
Oscar Streit (1873–1935), American baseball player
Roberto Streit (born 1983), Brazilian racing driver
Saul S. Streit (1897–1983), Polish-American lawyer, politician, and judge
Sigismund Streit (1687–1775), German merchant and art patron

Surname used as given name
Samuel Streit Coursen (1926–1950), American military officer and Medal of Honor recipient 
Richard Streit Hamilton (born 1943), American mathematician
Christian Streit White (1839–1917), American military officer, court clerk, and politician

Organizations
 Streit Council, a nonprofit foreign-policy organization 
 C. F. Streit Mfg. Co., a Cincinnati furniture manufacturer in the 19th and 20th centuries
 STREIT Group, an armoured vehicle manufacturer, based in Ras Al Khaimah, United Arab Emirates